

Events

Pre-1600
17 – Germanicus celebrates a triumph in Rome for his victories over the Cherusci, Chatti, and other German tribes west of the Elbe.
 451 – Battle of Avarayr between Armenian rebels and the Sasanian Empire takes place. The Sasanids defeat the Armenians militarily but guarantee them freedom to openly practice Christianity.
 946 – King Edmund I of England is murdered by a thief whom he personally attacks while celebrating St Augustine's Mass Day.
 961 – King Otto I elects his six-year-old son Otto II as heir apparent and co-ruler of the East Frankish Kingdom. He is crowned at Aachen, and placed under the tutelage of his grandmother Matilda.
1135 – Alfonso VII of León and Castile is crowned in León Cathedral as Imperator totius Hispaniae (Emperor of all of Spain). 
1293 – An earthquake strikes Kamakura, Kanagawa, Japan, killing about 23,000.
1328 – William of Ockham, the Franciscan Minister-General Michael of Cesena, and two other Franciscan leaders secretly leave Avignon, fearing a death sentence from Pope John XXII.
1538 – Geneva expels John Calvin and his followers from the city. Calvin lives in exile in Strasbourg for the next three years.
1573 – The Battle of Haarlemmermeer, a naval engagement in the Dutch War of Independence.

1601–1900
1637 – Pequot War: A combined English and Mohegan force under John Mason attacks a village in Connecticut, massacring approximately 500 Pequots.
1644 – Portuguese Restoration War: Portuguese and Spanish forces both claim victory in the Battle of Montijo.
1736 – The Battle of Ackia is fought near the present site of Tupelo, Mississippi. British and Chickasaw soldiers repel a French and Choctaw attack on the then-Chickasaw village of Ackia.
1783 – A Great Jubilee Day held at North Stratford, Connecticut, celebrates the end of fighting in the American Revolution. 
1805 – Napoléon Bonaparte assumes the title of King of Italy and is crowned with the Iron Crown of Lombardy in Milan Cathedral, the gothic cathedral in Milan.
1821 – Establishment of the Peloponnesian Senate by the Greek rebels.
1822 – At least 113 people die in the Grue Church fire, the biggest fire disaster in Norway's history.
1864 – Montana is organized as a United States territory.
1865 – American Civil War: The Confederate General Edmund Kirby Smith, commander of the Confederate Trans-Mississippi division, is the last full general of the Confederate Army to surrender, at Galveston, Texas.
1868 – The Impeachment of Andrew Johnson ends with his acquittal by one vote.
1869 – Boston University is chartered by the Commonwealth of Massachusetts.
1879 – Russia and the United Kingdom sign the Treaty of Gandamak establishing an Afghan state.
1896 – Nicholas II is crowned as the last Tsar of Imperial Russia.
  1896   – Charles Dow publishes the first edition of the Dow Jones Industrial Average.
1900 – Thousand Days' War: The Colombian Conservative Party turns the tide of war in their favor with victory against the Colombian Liberal Party in the Battle of Palonegro.

1901–present
1903 – Românul de la Pind, the longest-running newspaper by and about Aromanians until World War II, is founded.
1908 – The first major commercial oil strike in the Middle East is made at Masjed Soleyman in southwest Persia. The rights to the resource were quickly acquired by the Anglo-Persian Oil Company.
1917 – Several powerful tornadoes rip through Illinois, including the city of Mattoon.
1918 – The Democratic Republic of Georgia is established.
1923 – The first 24 Hours of Le Mans is held and has since been run annually in June.
1927 – The last Ford Model T rolls off the assembly line after a production run of 15,007,003 vehicles.
1936 – In the House of Commons of Northern Ireland, Tommy Henderson begins speaking on the Appropriation bill. By the time he sits down in the early hours of the following morning, he had spoken for ten hours.
1937 – Walter Reuther and members of the United Auto Workers (UAW) clash with Ford Motor Company security guards at the River Rouge Complex complex in Dearborn, Michigan, during the Battle of the Overpass.
1938 – In the United States, the House Un-American Activities Committee begins its first session.
1940 – World War II: Operation Dynamo: In northern France, Allied forces begin a massive evacuation from Dunkirk, France.
  1940   – World War II: The Siege of Calais ends with the surrender of the British and French garrison.
1942 – World War II: The Battle of Gazala takes place.
1948 – The U.S. Congress passes Public Law 80-557, which permanently establishes the Civil Air Patrol as an auxiliary of the United States Air Force.
1966 – British Guiana gains independence, becoming Guyana.
1967 – The Beatles' Sgt. Pepper's Lonely Hearts Club Band is released.
1968 – H-dagurinn in Iceland: Traffic changes from driving on the left to driving on the right overnight.
1969 – Apollo program: Apollo 10 returns to Earth after a successful eight-day test of all the components needed for the forthcoming first crewed moon landing.
1970 – The Soviet Tupolev Tu-144 becomes the first commercial transport to exceed Mach 2.
1971 – Bangladesh Liberation War: The Pakistan Army slaughters at least 71 Hindus in Burunga, Sylhet, Bangladesh.
1972 – The United States and the Soviet Union sign the Anti-Ballistic Missile Treaty.
1981 – Italian Prime Minister Arnaldo Forlani and his coalition cabinet resign following a scandal over membership of the pseudo-masonic lodge P2 (Propaganda Due).
  1981   – An EA-6B Prowler crashes on the flight deck of the aircraft carrier , killing 14 crewmen and injuring 45 others.
1983 – The 7.8  Sea of Japan earthquake shakes northern Honshu with a maximum Mercalli intensity of VIII (Severe). A destructive tsunami is generated that leaves about 100 people dead.
1986 – The European Community adopts the European flag.
1991 – Zviad Gamsakhurdia becomes the first elected President of the Republic of Georgia in the post-Soviet era.
  1991   – Lauda Air Flight 004 breaks apart in mid-air and crashes in the Phu Toei National Park in the Suphan Buri Province of Thailand, killing all 223 people on board.
1998 – The Supreme Court of the United States rules in New Jersey v. New York that Ellis Island, the historic gateway for millions of immigrants, is mainly in the state of New Jersey, not New York.
  1998   – The first "National Sorry Day" is held in Australia. Reconciliation events are held nationally, and attended by over a million people.
  1998   – A MIAT Mongolian Airlines Harbin Y-12 crashes near Erdenet, Orkhon Province, Mongolia, resulting in 28 deaths.
2002 – The tugboat Robert Y. Love collides with a support pier of Interstate 40 on the Arkansas River near Webbers Falls, Oklahoma, resulting in 14 deaths and 11 others injured.
2003 – Ukrainian-Mediterranean Airlines Flight 4230 crashes in the Turkish town of Maçka, killing 75.
2004 – United States Army veteran Terry Nichols is found guilty of 161 state murder charges for helping carry out the Oklahoma City bombing.
2008 – Severe flooding begins in eastern and southern China that will ultimately cause 148 deaths and force the evacuation of 1.3 million.
2020 – Protests triggered by the murder of George Floyd erupt in Minneapolis–Saint Paul, before becoming widespread across the United States and around the world.
2021 – Ten people are killed in a shooting at a VTA rail yard in San Jose, California, United States.

Births

Pre-1600
1264 – Koreyasu, Japanese prince and shōgun (d. 1326)
1478 – Clement VII, pope of the Catholic Church (d. 1534)
1562 – James III, margrave of Baden-Hachberg (d. 1590)
1566 – Mehmed III, Ottoman sultan (d. 1603)

1601–1900
1602 – Philippe de Champaigne, Dutch-French painter (d. 1674)
1623 – William Petty, English economist and philosopher (d. 1687)
1650 – John Churchill, 1st Duke of Marlborough, English general and politician, Lord Lieutenant of Oxfordshire (d. 1722)
1667 – Abraham de Moivre, French-English mathematician and theorist (d. 1754)
1669 – Sébastien Vaillant, French botanist and mycologist (d. 1722)
1700 – Nicolaus Zinzendorf, German bishop and saint (d. 1760)
1750 – William Morgan, British actuary (d. 1833)
1799 – August Kopisch, German poet and painter (d. 1853)
1822 – Edmond de Goncourt, French author and critic, founded the Académie Goncourt (d. 1896)
1863 – Bob Fitzsimmons, English-New Zealand boxer (d. 1917)
1865 – Robert W. Chambers, American author and illustrator (d. 1933)
1867 – Mary of Teck, English-born queen consort of the United Kingdom (d. 1953)
1873 – Olaf Gulbransson, Norwegian painter and illustrator (d. 1958)
1876 – Percy Perrin, English cricketer (d. 1945)
1880 – W. Otto Miessner, American composer and educator (d. 1967)
1881 – Adolfo de la Huerta, Mexican politician and provisional president, 1920 (d. 1955)
1883 – Mamie Smith, American singer, actress, dancer, and pianist (d. 1946)
1886 – Al Jolson, American singer and actor (d. 1950)
1887 – Ba U, 2nd President of Burma (d. 1963)
1893 – Eugene Aynsley Goossens, English conductor and composer (d. 1962)
1895 – Dorothea Lange, American photographer and journalist (d. 1965)
  1895   – Paul Lukas, Hungarian-American actor and singer (d. 1971)
1898 – Ernst Bacon, American pianist, composer, and conductor (d. 1990)
  1898   – Christfried Burmeister, Estonian speed skater (d. 1965)
1899 – Antonio Barrette, Canadian lawyer and politician, 18th Premier of Quebec (d. 1968)
  1899   – Muriel McQueen Fergusson, Canadian lawyer and politician, Canadian Speaker of the Senate (d. 1997)
1900 – Karin Juel, Swedish singer, actress, and writer (d. 1976)

1901–present
1904 – George Formby, English singer-songwriter and actor (d. 1961)
  1904   – Necip Fazıl Kısakürek, Turkish author, poet, and playwright (d. 1983)
  1904   – Vlado Perlemuter, Lithuanian-French pianist and educator (d. 2002)
1907 – Jean Bernard, French physician and haematologist (d. 2006)
  1907   – John Wayne, American actor, director, and producer (d. 1979)
1908 – Robert Morley, English actor (d. 1992)
  1908   – Nguyễn Ngọc Thơ, Vietnamese politician, 1st Prime Minister of the Republic of Vietnam (d. 1976)
1909 – Matt Busby, Scottish footballer and manager (d. 1994)
  1909   – Adolfo López Mateos, Mexican politician, 48th President of Mexico (d. 1969)
1910 – Imi Lichtenfeld, Hungarian-Israeli martial artist, boxer, and gymnast (d. 1998)
1911 – Maurice Baquet, French actor and cellist (d. 2005) 
  1911   – Henry Ephron, American playwright, screenwriter, and producer (d. 1992)
1912 – János Kádár, Hungarian mechanic and politician, 46th Prime Minister of Hungary (d. 1989)
  1912   – Jay Silverheels, Canadian-American actor (d. 1980)
1913 – Peter Cushing, English actor (d. 1994)
  1913   – Pierre Daninos, French author (d. 2005)
  1913   – Karin Ekelund, Swedish actress (d. 1976)
  1913   – Josef Manger, German weightlifter (d. 1991)
1914 – Frankie Manning, American dancer and choreographer (d. 2009)
1915 – Vernon Alley, American bassist (d. 2004)
  1915   – Antonia Forest, English author (d. 2003)
1916 – Henriette Roosenburg, Dutch journalist and author (d. 1972)
1919 – Rubén González, Cuban pianist (d. 2003)
1920 – Jack Cheetham, South African cricketer (d. 1980)
  1920   – Peggy Lee, American singer-songwriter and actress (d. 2002)
1921 – Inge Borkh, German soprano (d. 2018)
1923 – James Arness, American actor (d. 2011)
  1923   – Roy Dotrice, English actor (d. 2017)
1925 – Carmen Montejo, Cuban-Mexican actress (d. 2013)
  1925   – Alec McCowen, English actor (d. 2017)
1926 – Miles Davis, American trumpet player, composer, and bandleader (d. 1991)
1927 – Jacques Bergerac, French actor and businessman (d. 2014)
1928 – Jack Kevorkian, American pathologist, author, and assisted suicide activist (d. 2011)
1929 – J. F. Ade Ajayi, Nigerian historian and academic (d. 2014)
  1929   – Ernie Carroll, Australian television personality and producer
  1929   – Hans Freeman,  Australian bioinorganic chemist and protein crystallographer (d. 2008)
  1929   – Catherine Sauvage, French singer and actress (d. 1998)
1930 – Karim Emami, Indian-Iranian lexicographer and critic (d. 2005)
1935 – Eero Loone, Estonian philosopher and academic
1936 – Natalya Gorbanevskaya, Russian-Polish poet and activist (d. 2013)
1937 – Manorama, Indian actress and singer (d. 2015)
  1937   – Paul E. Patton, American politician, 59th Governor of Kentucky 
1938 – William Bolcom, American pianist and composer
  1938   – Andrew Clennel Palmer, British engineer (d. 2019)
  1938   – Lyudmila Petrushevskaya, Russian author and playwright
  1938   – K. Bikram Singh, Indian director and producer (d. 2013)
  1938   – Teresa Stratas, Canadian soprano and actress
1940 – Monique Gagnon-Tremblay, Canadian academic and politician, Deputy Premier of Quebec
  1940   – Levon Helm, American singer-songwriter, drummer, producer, and actor (d. 2012)
1941 – Aldrich Ames, American CIA officer and criminal
  1941   – Jim Dobbin, Scottish microbiologist and politician (d. 2014)
  1941   – Cliff Drysdale, South African tennis player and sportscaster
  1941   – Imants Kalniņš, Latvian composer 
1943 – Erica Terpstra, Dutch swimmer, journalist, and politician
1944 – Phil Edmonston, American-Canadian journalist and politician
  1944   – Jan Kinder, Norwegian ice hockey player (d. 2013)
  1944   – Sam Posey, American race car driver and journalist
1945 – Vilasrao Deshmukh, Indian lawyer and politician, 17th Chief Minister of Maharashtra (d. 2012)
  1945   – Alistair MacDuff, English lawyer and judge
  1945   – Garry Peterson, Canadian-American drummer 
1946 – Neshka Robeva, Bulgarian gymnast and coach
  1946   – Mick Ronson, English guitarist, songwriter, and producer (d. 1993)
1947 – Carol O'Connell, American author and painter
  1947   – Glenn Turner, New Zealand cricketer
1948 – Stevie Nicks, American singer-songwriter 
1949 – Jeremy Corbyn, British journalist and politician
  1949   – Ward Cunningham, American computer programmer, developed the first wiki
  1949   – Pam Grier, American actress 
  1949   – Anne McGuire, Scottish educator and politician
  1949   – Philip Michael Thomas, American actor
  1949   – Hank Williams Jr., American singer-songwriter and guitarist
1951 – Ramón Calderón, Spanish lawyer and businessman
  1951   – Lou van den Dries, Dutch mathematician
  1951   – Muhammed Faris, Syrian military aviator and cosmonaut
  1951   – Sally Ride, American physicist and astronaut, founded Sally Ride Science (d. 2012)
  1951   – Madeleine Taylor-Quinn, Irish educator and politician
1953 – Kay Hagan, American lawyer and politician (d. 2019)
  1953   – Don McAllister, English footballer and manager
  1953   – Michael Portillo, English journalist, politician and TV presenter
1954 – Michael Devine, Irish Republican hunger strike participant (died 1981)
1954 – Alan Hollinghurst, English novelist, poet, short story writer, and translator
  1954   – Denis Lebel, Canadian businessman and politician, 29th Canadian Minister of Transport
1955 – Masaharu Morimoto, Japanese-American chef
  1955   – Paul Stoddart, Australian businessman
1956 – Fiona Shackleton, English lawyer
  1956   – Jyoti Gogte, Indian academician
1957 – Diomedes Díaz, Colombian singer-songwriter (d. 2013)
  1957   – François Legault, Canadian businessman and politician
  1957   – Roberto Ravaglia, Italian racing driver
1958 – Ronnie Black, American golfer
  1958   – Arto Bryggare, Finnish hurdler and politician
  1958   – Margaret Colin, American actress
1959 – Ole Bornedal, Danish actor, director, and producer
1960 – Doug Hutchison, American actor
  1960   – Dean Lukin, Australian weightlifter
  1960   – Masahiro Matsunaga, Japanese racing driver
  1960   – Rob Murphy, American baseball player
  1960   – Romas Ubartas, Lithuanian discus thrower
1961 – Steve Pate, American golfer
  1961   – Tarsem Singh, Indian-American director, producer, and screenwriter
1962 – Black, English singer-songwriter (d. 2016)
  1962   – Genie Francis, Canadian-American actress
  1962   – Bobcat Goldthwait, American actor, director, and screenwriter
1963 – Simon Armitage, English poet, playwright and novelist
  1963   – Claude Legault, Canadian actor and screenwriter
  1963   – Mary Nightingale, English journalist
  1963   – Jamie Spence, English golfer
1964 – Caitlín R. Kiernan, Irish-American paleontologist and author
  1964   – Lenny Kravitz, American singer-songwriter, multi-instrumentalist, producer, and actor
  1964   – Argiris Pedoulakis, Greek basketball player and coach
1966 – Helena Bonham Carter, English actress 
  1966   – Zola Budd, South African runner
1967 – Philip Treacy, Irish milliner, hat designer
  1967   – Mika Yamamoto, Japanese journalist (d. 2012)
1968 – Fernando León de Aranoa, Spanish director, producer, and screenwriter
  1968   – Frederik, Crown Prince of Denmark
  1968   – Steve Sedgley, English footballer and manager
1969 – John Baird, Canadian politician, 10th Canadian Minister of Foreign Affairs
  1969   – Siri Lindley, American triathlete and coach
1970 – Nobuhiro Watsuki, Japanese illustrator
1971 – Zaher Andary, Lebanese footballer
  1971   – Matt Stone, American actor, animator, screenwriter, producer, and composer
1973 – Naomi Harris, Canadian-American photographer
1974 – Lars Frölander, Swedish swimmer
1975 – Lauryn Hill, American singer-songwriter, producer, and actress 
1976 – Paul Collingwood, English cricketer and coach
  1976   – Stephen Curry, Australian comedian and actor
  1976   – Kenny Florian, American mixed martial artist and sportscaster
  1976   – Justin Pierre, American singer-songwriter, guitarist, and producer 
1977 – Nikos Chatzivrettas, Greek basketball player
  1977   – Raina Telgemeier, American author and cartoonist
  1977   – Luca Toni, Italian footballer
  1977   – Misaki Ito, Japanese actress and model
1978 – Phil Elvrum, American singer-songwriter and guitarist 
  1978   – Fabio Firmani, Italian footballer
  1978   – Dan Parks, Australian-Scottish rugby player
1979 – Amanda Bauer, American astronomer and academic
  1979   – Natalya Nazarova, Russian sprinter
  1979   – Elisabeth Harnois, American actress
  1979   – Mehmet Okur, Turkish basketball player
1980 – Louis-Jean Cormier, Canadian singer and songwriter
1981 – Anthony Ervin, American swimmer
  1981   – Jason Manford, English actor, screenwriter, and television host
  1981   – Ben Zobrist, American baseball player
1982 – Hasan Kabze, Turkish footballer
1983 – Demy de Zeeuw, Dutch footballer
  1983   – Nathan Merritt, Australian rugby league player
1985 – Monika Christodoulou, Greek singer-songwriter and guitarist
  1985   – Ashley Vincent, English footballer
1986 – Michel Tornéus, Swedish long jumper
1987 – Olcay Şahan, Turkish footballer
1988 – Andrea Catellani, Italian footballer
  1988   – Dani Samuels, Australian discus thrower
  1988   – Damian Williams, American football player
1989 – Paula Findlay, Canadian triathlete
1991 – Ah Young, South Korean singer and actress
1993 – Jason Adesanya, Belgian footballer
  1993   – Jimmy Vesey, American ice hockey player
1996 – Lara Goodall, South African cricketer
1999 – Georgia Wareham, Australian cricketer

Deaths

Pre-1600
 604 – Augustine of Canterbury, Benedictine monk and archbishop
 735 – Bede, English monk, historian, and theologian
 818 – Ali al-Ridha, Saudi Arabian 8th of The Twelve Imams
 926 – Yuan Xingqin, Chinese general and governor
 946 – Edmund I, king of England (b. 921)
1035 – Berenguer Ramon I, Spanish nobleman (b. 1005)
1055 – Adalbert, margrave of Austria
1250 – Peter I, duke of Brittany
1339 – Aldona Ona, queen of Poland
1362 – Louis I, king of Naples (b. 1320)
1421 – Mehmed I, Ottoman sultan (b. 1389)
1512 – Bayezid II, Ottoman sultan (b. 1447)
1536 – Francesco Berni, Italian poet (b. 1498)
1552 – Sebastian Münster, German cartographer and cosmographer (b. 1488)

1601–1900
1648 – Vincent Voiture, French poet and author (b. 1597)
1653 – Robert Filmer, English theorist and author (b. 1588)
1679 – Ferdinand Maria, Elector of Bavaria (b. 1636)
1685 – Charles II, German elector palatine (b. 1651)
1702 – Zeb-un-Nissa, Mughal princess and poet (d. 1638)
1703 – Samuel Pepys, English politician (b. 1633)
1742 – Pylyp Orlyk, Ukrainian diplomat (b. 1672) 
1746 – Thomas Southerne, Irish playwright (b. 1660)
1762 – Alexander Gottlieb Baumgarten, German philosopher and academic (b. 1714)
1799 – James Burnett, Lord Monboddo, Scottish linguist, biologist, and judge (b. 1714)
1818 – Michael Andreas Barclay de Tolly, Russian field marshal and politician, Governor-General of Finland (b. 1761)
  1818   – Manuel Rodríguez Erdoíza, Chilean lawyer and guerrilla leader (b. 1785)
1824 – Capel Lofft, English lawyer (b. 1751)
1840 – Sidney Smith, English admiral and politician (b. 1764)
1881 – Jakob Bernays, German philologist and academic (b. 1824)
1883 – Abdelkader El Djezairi, Algerian ruler (b. 1808)

1901–present
1902 – Almon Brown Strowger, American soldier and inventor (b. 1839)
1908 – Mirza Ghulam Ahmad, Indian religious leader, founded the Ahmadiyya movement (b. 1835)
1914 – Jacob August Riis, Danish-American journalist, photographer, and reformer (b. 1849)
1924 – Victor Herbert, Irish-American cellist, composer, and conductor, founded the American Society of Composers, Authors and Publishers (b. 1859)
1926 – Srečko Kosovel, Slovenian poet (b. 1904)
1933 – Horatio Bottomley, English financier, journalist, and politician (b. 1860)
  1933   – Jimmie Rodgers, American singer-songwriter and guitarist (b. 1897)
1939 – Charles Horace Mayo, American physician, co-founded Mayo Clinic (b. 1865)
1943 – Edsel Ford, American businessman (b. 1893)
  1943   – Alice Tegnér, Swedish organist, composer, and educator (b. 1864)
1944 – Christian Wirth, German SS officer (b. 1885)
1948 – Torsten Bergström, Swedish actor and director (b. 1896)
1951 – Lincoln Ellsworth, American explorer (b. 1880)
1954 – Lionel Conacher, Canadian football player and politician (b. 1900)
1955 – Alberto Ascari, Italian racing driver (b. 1918)
1956 – Al Simmons, American baseball player and coach (b. 1902)
1959 – Philip Kassel, American gymnast (b. 1876)
1964 – Ruben Oskar Auervaara, Finnish fraudster (b. 1906)
1966 – Elizabeth Dilling, American author and activist (b. 1894)
1969 – Paul Hawkins, Australian racing driver (b. 1937)
  1969   – Allan Haines Loughead, American engineer, co-founded the Lockheed Corporation (b. 1889)
1974 – Silvio Moser, Swiss racing driver (b. 1941)
1976 – Martin Heidegger, German philosopher and academic (b. 1889)
1978 – Cybele Andrianou, Greek actress (b. 1887)
1979 – George Brent, Irish-American actor (b. 1904)
1984 – Elizabeth Peer, American journalist (b. 1936)
1989 – Don Revie, English footballer and manager (b. 1927)
1994 – Sonny Sharrock, American guitarist (b. 1940)
1995 – Friz Freleng, American animator, director, and producer (b. 1906)
1997 – Ralph Horween, American football player and coach (b. 1896)
1999 – Paul Sacher, Swiss conductor and philanthropist (b. 1906)
  1999   – Waldo Semon, American chemist and engineer (b. 1898)
2001 – Vittorio Brambilla, Italian racing driver (b. 1937)
  2001   – Anne Haney, American actress (b. 1934)
  2001   – Moven Mahachi, Zimbabwean soldier and politician, Zimbabwean Minister of Defence (b. 1952)
  2001   – Dona Massin, Canadian actress and choreographer (b. 1917)
2002 – Mamo Wolde, Ethiopian runner (b. 1932)
2003 – Kathleen Winsor, American journalist and author (b. 1919)
2004 – Nikolai Chernykh, Russian astronomer (b. 1931)
2005 – Eddie Albert, American actor (b. 1906)
  2005   – Chico Carrasquel, Venezuelan baseball player and manager (b. 1928)
  2005   – Ruth Laredo, American pianist and educator (b. 1937)
  2005   – Leslie Smith, English businessman, co-founded Lesney Products (b. 1918)
2006 – Édouard Michelin, French businessman (b. 1963)
  2006   – Kevin O'Flanagan, Irish footballer and physician (b. 1919)
2007 – Jack Edward Oliver, English illustrator (b. 1942)
  2007   – Howard Porter, American basketball player (b. 1948)
2008 – Sydney Pollack, American actor, director, and screenwriter (b. 1934)
  2008   – Zita Urbonaitė, Lithuanian cyclist (b. 1973)
2009 – Mihalis Papagiannakis, Greek journalist and politician (b. 1941)
  2009   – Peter Zezel, Canadian ice hockey and soccer player (b. 1965)
2010 – Art Linkletter, Canadian-American radio and television host (b. 1912)
  2010   – Chris Moran, English air marshal and pilot (b. 1956) 
  2010   – Kieran Phelan, Irish politician (b. 1949)
2011 – Arisen Ahubudu, Sri Lankan scholar, author, and playwright (b. 1920)
2012 – Arthur Decabooter, Belgian cyclist (b. 1936)
  2012   – Leo Dillon, American illustrator (b. 1933)
  2012   – Stephen Healey, Welsh captain and footballer (b. 1982) 
  2012   – Hiroshi Miyazawa, Japanese politician (b. 1921)
  2012   – Hans Schmidt, Canadian wrestler (b. 1925)
  2012   – Jim Unger, English-Canadian illustrator (b. 1937)
2013 – Ray Barnhart, American businessman and politician (b. 1928)
  2013   – John Bierwirth, American lawyer and businessman (b. 1924)
  2013   – Roberto Civita, Italian-Brazilian businessman (b. 1936)
  2013   – Tom Lichtenberg, American football player and coach (b. 1940)
  2013   – Otto Muehl, Austrian painter (b. 1925)
  2013   – Jack Vance, American author (b. 1916)
2014 – Baselios Thoma Didymos I, Indian metropolitan (b. 1921)
  2014   – Miodrag Radulovacki, Serbian-American academic and neuropharmacologist (b. 1933)
  2014   – William R. Roy, American physician, journalist, and politician (b. 1926)
  2014   – Hooshang Seyhoun, Iranian-Canadian architect, sculptor, and painter (b. 1920)
2015 – Vicente Aranda, Spanish director, producer, and screenwriter (b. 1926)
  2015   – Les Johnson, Australian politician and diplomat, Australian High Commissioner to New Zealand (b. 1924)
  2015   – Robert Kraft, American astronomer and academic (b. 1927)
  2015   – João Lucas, Portuguese footballer (b. 1979)
2016 – Hedy Epstein, German-born American human rights activist and Holocaust survivor (b. 1924)
2017 – Zbigniew Brzezinski, Polish-born American politician (b. 1928)
2019 – Prem Tinsulanonda, Former Prime Minister of Thailand
2022 – Andy Fletcher, English musician (b. 1961)
  2022  – Ray Liotta, American actor (b. 1954)
  2022   – Alan White, English drummer (b. 1949)

Holidays and observances
Christian feast day:
Augustine of Canterbury (Anglican Communion and Eastern Orthodox)
Lambert of Vence
Peter Sanz (one of Martyr Saints of China)
Philip Neri 
Pope Eleutherius
Quadratus of Athens
Zachary, Bishop of Vienne
May 26 (Eastern Orthodox liturgics)
Independence Day, commemorates the day of the First Republic in 1918 (Georgia)
Independence Day, celebrates the independence of Guyana from the United Kingdom in 1966.
Mother's Day (Poland)
National Paper Airplane Day (United States)
National Sorry Day (Australia)

References

External links

 BBC: On This Day
 
 Historical Events on May 26

Days of the year
May